Mary Evelyn Hitchcock (Higgins; pen names, Mary Doyle and Mrs. Roswell D. Hitchcock; March 10, 1849 – April 6, 1920) was an American author and explorer. She was part of the theatrical company, Floradora Company, in the early 20th century, and also worked for the New York World as a reporter.

Early life and education
Mary Evelyn Higgins was born in Virginia, March 10, 1849. She was the daughter of Capt. Thomas A. (of Norfolk, Virginia) and Cecelia (Fitzgerald) Higgins. She was educated at Lawrence Academy, Groton, Massachusettsm where she received academic honors.

Career
She married Commander Roswell D. Hitchcock, USN, (son of Roswell Dwight Hitchcock) and they had one daughter, Harriet Bradford Hitchcock Harriman. Hitchcock accompanied her husband to the 1873 Vienna World's Fair, Paris Exposition, 1878, to Japan, 1882, where his ship remained two years; and again in 1892, when he was captain of USS Alert. After the death of the husband, she made a tour of the world.  

In 1898, she went to Klondike with her friend Edith Van Buren, embarking from San Francisco on a steamer.  Their luggage included multiple pets and an early motion picture device called an animatoscope. Hitchcock climbed Skagway Pass on foot before the days of the railroad. She subsequently wrote the book, Two Women in the Klondike, which described this visit to the Yukon.

Hitchcock was so impressed with the mining and agricultural possibilities of the Yukon that she spread the knowledge she had gained through lectures, which added largely to funds for churches and hospitals. She returned to the north, where she staked more than 100 claims and because so deeply interested financially that she spent the greater part of five years there. 

In 1904, Hitchcock organized and was president of The Entertainment Club, in New York City. She was also a Fellow of the National Geographic Society, as well as a member of the United Daughters of the Confederacy.

Two women in the Klondike

Two women in the Klondike: the story of a journey to the gold-fields of Alaska (New York, G. P. Putnam's Sons, 1899) describes the adventures of Hitchcock and Edith Van Buren, a grandniece of President Martin Van Buren , during a perilous and eventful journey taken in the summer of 1898. Owing to the waters of the Yukon River being low, the two women were delayed for some time at Dawson City where they located miner's claims and lived as squatters. Besides the interesting incidents of travel included, the book included graphic descriptions of the Klondike region, and accounts of local customs and superstitions, as well as mining methods.

Death
Mary Evelyn Hitchcock died April 6, 1920, and was buried at Oak Grove Cemetery, Fall River, Massachusetts.

Selected works
 Two women in the Klondike : the story of a journey to the gold-fields of Alaska, 1899
 Tales out of school about naval officers (and others) by a woman who has lived on a man-of-war, 1908
 First reader : for use in the first year, 1912
 Second reader : for use in the second year, 1912
 Third reader, 1912
 Standard Catholic readers by grades. Third year, 1913
 Fifth reader : for use in the seventh and eighth years, 1913
 Life was like that, 1936

References

Attribution

Bibliography

External links
 

1849 births
1920 deaths
American explorers
American travel writers
19th-century American women writers
Female travelers
People from Virginia
People of the Klondike Gold Rush
American women travel writers
20th-century American women writers
19th-century American writers
20th-century American non-fiction writers
American gold prospectors